Xizhi is a railway station in Xizhi District, New Taipei, Taiwan served by Taiwan Railways.

Overview

The station has two island platforms.

History
20 October 1891: The station opened as Tsui-tng-ka Pier.
1945: The name was changed to the current "Xizhi Station".
9 April 2006: Following the construction of the elevated station, the new tracks and station came into service.
1 August 2008: The station begins accepting EasyCard as payment for travel

Around the station
Keelung River
Xizhi District Office (350m to the southwest)
Xiufeng High School (next to the station)
Xizhi Old Street (200m to the northeast)
Xizhi Night Market (200m to the southwest)
Provincial Highway No. 5 (200m to the south)
Shuifanjiao Park (250m to the north)

See also
 List of railway stations in Taiwan

References

External links 

TRA Xizhi Station
Taiwan Railways Administration

1891 establishments in Taiwan
Railway stations opened in 1891
Railway stations in New Taipei
Railway stations served by Taiwan Railways Administration